Brecon and Radnorshire is a county constituency in Wales of the House of Commons of the Parliament of the United Kingdom. Created in 1918, it elects one Member of Parliament (MP) by the first-past-the-post system of election. The constituency is represented by Fay Jones of the Conservative Party, who defeated incumbent Jane Dodds of the Liberal Democrats at the 2019 general election.

Boundaries

The boundaries of the constituency correspond broadly with the ancient counties of Brecknockshire and Radnorshire. Radnorshire is included in full, and the only significantly populated area from Brecknockshire not in this constituency is Brynmawr, which is in Blaenau Gwent. This is the largest constituency in England and Wales by area. No town in the constituency exceeds a population of 10,000, the largest being Ystradgynlais at roughly 9,000. Other towns in the constituency are Brecon, Knighton, Crickhowell and Llandrindod Wells. The remainder of the constituency is largely made up of small villages and land used for farming sheep: sheep outnumber humans in Powys as a whole by around ten to one.

Under planned constituency changes announced in September 2016 ahead of the next general election, it was proposed to merge this seat with the southern half of Montgomeryshire, including Newtown, to form a new constituency called Brecon, Radnor and Montgomery.

History
The constituency was created in the boundary changes of 1918 by merging Breconshire and Radnorshire, both previously constituencies in their own right. While once a Labour stronghold, the constituency was captured from the Conservative government by the SDP–Liberal Alliance at a dramatic by-election in 1985. It was regained by the Conservatives in 1992, taken back by the Liberal Democrats in 1997, and then returned to the Conservatives in 2015. It was the Conservatives' fifteenth target seat at the 2005 election, but the party's share of the vote fell, leaving it as the Conservatives' 95th target seat in 2010, requiring a swing of 5.09%. In the event, the swing to the Conservatives was 0.3%, and the Liberal Democrats retained the seat, with Roger Williams remaining the MP. In 2015 the seat was reclaimed for the Conservatives by Chris Davies, whose majority of 5,102 was the largest in the constituency since Tom Hooson won the seat, also for the Conservatives, in 1983. Roger Williams stood for the Liberal Democrats in 2015 but shed over 6,500 votes from his 2010 result, a loss of 17.8%.

In 2019, Davies pleaded guilty to filing false expenses claims, triggering a recall petition, the third such petition in the UK. The petition was successful, forcing Davies to vacate the seat. A by-election was held on 1 August, which was won by Liberal Democrat candidate Jane Dodds. Dodds was then defeated by Conservative Fay Jones at the general election in December 2019.

Members of Parliament

Elections

Elections in the 1910s

Elections in the 1920s

Elections in the 1930s

Elections in the 1940s
General Election 1939–40:

Another general election was required to take place before the end of 1940. The political parties had been making preparations for an election to take place from 1939 and by the end of this year, the following candidates had been selected; 
Labour: William Jackson

Elections in the 1950s

Elections in the 1960s

Elections in the 1970s

Elections in the 1980s

Elections in the 1990s

The Labour candidate, Chris Mann, won the selection over future AMs Carwyn Jones and Jeffrey Cuthbert, and future AM and MP Peter Law.

Elections in the 2000s

Elections in the 2010s

Following the successful recall petition of Christopher Davies, a by-election was held on 1 August 2019.

Of the 73 rejected ballots:
58 were either unmarked or it was uncertain who the vote was for.
14 voted for more than one candidate. 
1 had writing or mark by which the voter could be identified.

Changes in vote share are compared to the 2017 general election, not the 2019 by-election. 

Of the 110 rejected ballots:
87 were either unmarked or it was uncertain who the vote was for.
21 voted for more than one candidate.
2 had writing or mark by which the voter could be identified.

Elections in the 2020s

See also
 Brecon and Radnorshire (Senedd constituency)
 List of parliamentary constituencies in Powys
 List of parliamentary constituencies in Wales

Notes

References

External links
nomis Constituency Profile for Brecon and Radnorshire — presenting data from the ONS annual population survey and other official statistics.
Politics Resources (Election results from 1922 onwards)
Electoral Calculus (Election results from 1955 onwards)
2017 Election House of Commons Library 2017 Election report
A Vision Of Britain Through Time (Constituency elector numbers)

Brecknockshire
Parliamentary constituencies in Mid Wales
Politics of Powys
Radnorshire
Constituencies of the Parliament of the United Kingdom established in 1918
1918 establishments in Wales